Smaller Chairs for the Early 1900s is the first release by the rock band Moneen.

Track listing

Moneen albums
2000 EPs